Caerleon (27 March 1980 – 2 February 1998) was an American-bred, Irish-trained Thoroughbred racehorse who won Group One races in France and Great Britain. He was twice champion sire in Great Britain and Ireland. Bred by Seth Hancock at his famous Claiborne Farm in Kentucky, he was a son of the 1970 British Triple Crown winner Nijinsky. His dam was Foreseer, a daughter of U.S. Racing Hall of Fame inductee, Round Table.

Caerleon was purchased at the Keeneland Yearling Sale by leading British owner, Robert Sangster. As a two-year-old, he made two starts at the Curragh Racecourse in Ireland for trainer Vincent O'Brien, earning wins in his debut and the Anglesey Stakes. At age three, he won the French Derby at Chantilly Racecourse in France and the Benson & Hedges Gold Cup at York Racecourse in England. Back at the Curragh, he ran second to Shareef Dancer in the Irish Derby.

Stud record
Caerleon was retired to stud duty at Coolmore Stud for the 1984 season. In North America, he was known as Caerleon II. An immediate success, he became the leading sire in Great Britain and Ireland in 1988 and again in 1991. During his career at stud, Caerleon sired 101 stakes winners including:

 Caerwent (b. 1985) - won G1 National Stakes
 Cape Verdi (b. 1995) - won G1 1000 Guineas
 Corwyn Bay (b. 1986)  - Anglesey Stakes, Cartier Million, Ancient Title Stakes
 Kostroma (b. 1986) - multiple G1 winner in the U.S. who set a world record for 1 1/8 miles on grass
 Lady Carla (1993) - won Epsom Oaks
 Missionary Ridge (b. 1987) - won G1 Pacific Classic Stakes, career earnings US$1,864,498
 Generous (b. 1988) -  won 1991 the Derby and the Irish Derby; 1991 European champion and world's highest-rated racehorse
 Only Royale (b. 1989) - won G1 Yorkshire Oaks (2x)
 Moonax (b. 1991) - won G1s St. Leger Stakes, Prix Royal-Oak, 1994 European Champion Stayer
 Overbury (b. 1991) - won the Queen Elizabeth II Cup in Hong Kong, the G2 American Derby at Arlington Park in Chicago
 Auriette (b. 1992) - won Honeymoon Handicap (1995), Santa Barbara Handicap (1996)
 Grape Tree Road (b. 1993) - won G1 Grand Prix de Paris
 Coretta (b. 1994) - won La Prevoyante Handicap (2x), Long Island Handicap, Orchid Handicap
 Sunspangled (1996) - won Fillies' Mile
 Marienbard (b. 1997) - Won G1s Prix de l'Arc de Triomphe, Grosser Preis von Baden, Deutschland-Preis, career earnings £1,257,152
 Warrsan (b. 1998) - won G1s Coronation Cup (2x) and Grosser Preis von Baden (2x). Career earnings of  £1,654,749
 Preseli (1999) - won Moyglare Stud Stakes

Caerleon was also the damsire of:
 Mutafaweq - wins include the St. Leger Stakes and Canadian International
 Taiki Shuttle - 1998 Japanese Horse of the Year and Japan Racing Association Hall of Fame inductee
 Nashoba's Key - multiple Grade 1 winner and 2007 California Horse of the Year

Caerleon died at age eighteen on 2 February 1998, at Coolmore Stud in Ireland.

References
 Caerleon's pedigree and partial racing stats
 Bowen, Edward L. Legacies of the Turf : A Century of Great Thoroughbred Breeders (2003) Eclipse Press 

1980 racehorse births
1998 racehorse deaths
Racehorses bred in Kentucky
Racehorses trained in the United Kingdom
French Thoroughbred Classic Race winners
British Champion Thoroughbred Sires
Thoroughbred family 1-x